Yewei is a Southern Chinese term that describes various types of game meat, including bushmeat from exotic wild animals.

Terminology 
The character 野 means "wild", and is shortened from 野兽 (Traditional ), which means "wild beasts".

The character 味 literally means "taste", and metaphorically refers to various delicacies that appeals to the popular palate.

History 
Historically, members of the imperial courts in Chinese dynastic eras requested grand animals for their meals.  Famous examples include the Manchu Han Imperial Feast.  Today, yewei can be eaten by anyone with access to wild animals, which can also be imported.

Animals eaten 
Yewei can include badgers, bats, beavers, civets, crocodiles, foxes, giant salamanders, hedgehog, marmots, ostrich, otters,
pangolins, peacocks, pheasants, porcupines, rabbit and rabbit organs, rats, snakes (including many-banded krait), spotted deer, turtles and wolf pups.

Culture 
It has been reported that the consumption of wildlife appeals only to a minority of people in China. However, the topic of whether it should be consumed has had some mixed reactions. In a 2014 survey of several cities in China, 52.7% of respondents agreed with the statement that wildlife should not be consumed. 

According to The Guardian, locals in Southern China sometimes boast that they will "eat anything with four legs except a table".

The consumption of exotic wildlife, especially in Guangdong, came under heavy criticism after the SARS epidemic. Following the outbreak of COVID-19, the Chinese government formally made the practice illegal, amidst growing calls inside China to permanently ban the wildlife trade.

References 

Chinese imperial cuisine